Afrowatsonius burgeoni is a moth of the  family Erebidae. It is found in the Democratic Republic of Congo.

References

 Natural History Museum Lepidoptera generic names catalog

Spilosomina
Moths described in 1928
Moths of Africa
Endemic fauna of the Democratic Republic of the Congo